North Scituate is an MBTA Commuter Rail station in Scituate, Massachusetts. It serves the Greenbush Line. The station, located at 777 Country Way in North Scituate village, is the primary station for Scituate, while nearby Greenbush station primarily serves as a park-and-ride for adjacent communities. Like the other stations on the Greenbush Line, North Scituate consists of a single full-length high-level platform which provides accessible boarding to the line's single track.

History

South Shore Railroad
The modern Greenbush Line was originally built as the South Shore Railroad, which opened to Cohasset in 1849. The Old Colony-backed Duxbury and Cohasset Railroad, chartered in 1867, which opened from Cohasset to Duxbury in 1871, including a stop at North Scituate. Three other stations were, at various times, located in Scituate: Egypt station at Captain Pierce Road, Scituate (also called Scituate Harbor) at First Parish Road, and Greenbush at Driftway. After financial troubles in the 1870s, the Duxbury and Cohasset was joined with the South Shore under the fold of the Old Colony Railroad in 1877. The Old Colony was leased to the New York, New Haven, and Hartford Railroad in 1893.

New Haven Railroad
Ridership on the Greenbush Line diminished in the 1930s due to increased competition from automobiles. The line enjoyed a brief uptick in traffic in World War II with the construction of the Hingham Naval Ammunition Depot and the Hingham Naval Ammunition Depot Annex. The number of daily trips was increased from 4 to 8 after World War II under Frederick C. Dumaine, Jr., and modern diesel trains including Budd RDCs were introduced in the 1950s. However, the New Haven Railroad continued to lose money on the service, and after Dumaine was ousted the railroad announced all trains would cease running in 1958. Only an emergency subsidy by the state kept trains running until June 30, 1959 when the Southeast Expressway opened and all passenger train service ended. The former Spanish-style station, built in 1908-09, is located on Gannett Road near the modern station. It was converted for commercial use by 1962.

MBTA era
Calls for the former Old Colony lines to be reactivated began in the 1980s; the Plymouth/Kingston Line and Middleborough/Lakeville Line were reopened in 1997. After much controversy surrounding various aspects of the $534 million project, construction of the Greenbush Line was completed in mid-2007. 

The Greenbush line and North Scituate station were opened for full service on October 31, 2007 after a ceremonial train the previous day.

References

External links 

MBTA - North Scituate
Station from Google Maps Street View

Stations along Old Colony Railroad lines
Railway stations in the United States opened in 2007
MBTA Commuter Rail stations in Plymouth County, Massachusetts
2007 establishments in Massachusetts